Peter Zelem (born 13 February 1962, Manchester) is an English former professional footballer who played as a defender. He played in The Football League for four clubs during the 1980s.

Playing career
Zelem began with Blackpool on schoolboy forms but was released and joined Chester as an apprentice. He made his debut in a 1–0 win over Carlisle United in August 1980, one of six first-team appearances he made during the 1980–81 season. His first goal arrived on the opening day of the following season against Bristol Rovers and he became a regular over the next few years. By the start of 1984–85 he was the longest serving player at Chester, but he moved midway through the season to Wolverhampton Wanderers for £12,500. Although this initially gave Zelem the chance to play in the Second Division, the club were rapidly sliding downwards and were in the Fourth Division by the time he linked up with former Chester manager John McGrath at Preston North End in March 1987. He had the distinction of scoring the first goal in the Fourth Division for Wolves, on 23 August 1986, in their 2–1 home defeat to Cambridge United on the opening day of the league season.

He helped Preston to promotion before joining Burnley in the summer of 1987. After an injury hit two years at Turf Moor, Zelem left the club and joined non-league side Winsford United. He then moved on to Ashton United, but injury forced him to retire from playing. Away from football he has worked as a contract cleaner with his twin brother Alan (a former goalkeeper with Macclesfield Town). His niece is the footballer Katie Zelem.

Zelem was the first post-war Football League player to have a surname beginning with a Z, first appearing the season before Romeo Zondervan joined Ipswich Town.

External links
Burnley career stats

Bibliography

References

1962 births
Living people
Footballers from Manchester
English footballers
Association football defenders
English Football League players
Chester City F.C. players
Wolverhampton Wanderers F.C. players
Preston North End F.C. players
Burnley F.C. players
Winsford United F.C. players
Ashton United F.C. players